The 1987 International Rules Series was the third series between Gaelic footballers from Ireland and Australian rules footballers from Australia. The series took place in Ireland and consisted of three test matches between the Australian and Irish international rules football teams. Australia won the series 2–1 and by 27 over the three test matches.

Eugene McGee was in charge of the Irish team, while Seán McCague was his assistant manager.

Summary

First test
Venue: Croke Park, Dublin 
Crowd: 15,532

Second test
Venue: Croke Park, Dublin 
Crowd: 15,485

Third test
Venue: Croke Park, Dublin 
Crowd: 27,023

Beitzel Medal (Best player for the series) — Tony McGuinness (Australia)

References

External links
 Australia v. Ireland since 1967
 Aussie Rules International: The Third Series – 1987
 International Rules – Series 3 – 1987 – Ireland

International Rules Series
International Rules Series
International Rules series
International sports competitions hosted by Ireland